John McEuen, born December 19, 1945 in Oakland, California, is an American folk musician and a founding member of the Nitty Gritty Dirt Band.

Career

Solo work
John McEuen was born in Oakland, California. In 1964, at age 18, he became interested in music after seeing a performance by the Dillards, and learned to play the banjo. Eventually, he took an interest in fiddle and mandolin.  In 1986, after twenty years with the Dirt Band, McEuen departed to pursue a solo career. From 1991–1997, he released four albums for Vanguard Records. He composed music for movies and television and he appeared as a guest on albums with several artists including 5 albums with Michael Martin Murphey. He then returned to the Dirt Band in 2001.  John departed the band once again in late 2017.

Steve Martin
John McEuen has known Steve Martin since high school, when he would give Martin occasional lessons on the banjo. In 1978, he was asked by Martin to provide the backing band for a comic, novelty song called King Tut. With Martin on vocals, the Dirt Band recorded the song under the alias the Toot Uncommons.

John McEuen produced and played on Martin's album The Crow: New Songs for the 5-String Banjo (Rounder, 2009). The album was #1 for 7 months and won the Grammy Award for Best Bluegrass Album.

McEuen published an autobiography in 2018 titled The Life I've Picked - A Banjo Player's Nitty Gritty Journey.

Awards and honors
 The American Banjo Museum Hall of Fame Inductee
Independent Music Award for Best Americana Album, "Made in Brooklyn"

References

External links
 
 NAMM Oral History Interview with John McEuen March 6, 2004

1945 births
American country rock singers
American country singer-songwriters
American rock musicians
Country musicians from California
Living people
Musicians from Oakland, California
Nitty Gritty Dirt Band members
Singer-songwriters from California